Burt Malcolm Styler (February 20, 1925 – June 13, 2011) was an American television and film screenwriter and producer. His film credits include Bob Hope comedy Boy, Did I Get a Wrong Number! and such popular TV series as The Life of Riley, My Favorite Martian, Mayberry R.F.D., Gilligan's Island, McHale's Navy, Chico and The Man, M*A*S*H, The Carol Burnett Show, and Too Close For Comfort. He wrote the teleplay/scripts for four of the popular CBS-TV sitcom series All in the Family, for which he won a Primetime Emmy Award in 1972, for writing the episode "Edith's Problem". Styler died of heart failure on June 13, 2011, at the Providence Tarzana Medical Center.

References

Interview conducted with Burt Styler in 2007 by Stephen W. Bowie
http://www.classictvhistory.com/OralHistories/burt_styler.html

External links

1925 births
2011 deaths
American male screenwriters
Emmy Award winners
Writers from New York City
Television producers from New York City
Film producers from New York (state)
Screenwriters from New York (state)